4x4 is a Ghanaian hip hop musical group formed in 2000 by Captain Planet (Sylvanus Dodji Jeoffrey) and Coded, formerly Abortion (Russell Edem Avornyo) with the help of Ronnie Coches and Bright Bling Sparkles (Buk Bak). They are reputed to have brought crunk to Ghana. In 2007, Captain Planet and Abortion were joined by a new artist named Fresh Prince (Prince Tamakloe).

Background

Early career
Jeoffry and Avornyo were discovered by Buk Bak as participants in the Kiddafest TV programme showcasing young musical talent.  The name 4x4 reflects the four people who led to the creation of the group (Ronnie, Bright, Abortion, and Captain Planet). The duo released their debut album Siklitele under Buk Bak in 2003.
In 2009 4X4 Featured Prince Tamkole (Fresh Prince) in a record call "HotGirls.com. Later that year he was admitted to that group.

Contestant #1
4x4 released their second album Contestant No. 1 in 2007, with the single "HotGirls.com" featuring a new artist, Fresh Prince (Prince Tamakloe). The song is reputed to have introduced crunk to Ghanaian culture, and earned the group a Ghana Music Award nomination in 2008. "HotGirls.com" was a success, and Fresh Prince eventually joined the band.

World Trade Centre
In 2009, 4x4 released another album World Trade Center. which went platinum. The title song went to number one on the singles chart in Ghana  and is the first and currently only Ghanaian song to make the Urban Charts in Africa. The single "Waist and Power" has also received over 600,000 hits on YouTube.

Musical style and  influences
Captain Planet claims to have pioneered Ghanaian vernacular rap, using Akuapem Twi rap, Ga, Ewe, and Pidgin English.  Abortion contributes a ragga or dancehall style, which fuses singjaying and deejaying with Captain Planet's rapping to create an innovative form of hip life.
The group was and continues to be mentored by Ronnie Coches and Bright Bling Sparkles (Buk Bak).

Discography

Albums

Singles
 "HotGirls.com" (2007)
 "World Trade Center" (2008)
 "Waist and Power"

Awards

References

External links
 Twitter
 Facebook

Ghanaian hip hop musicians
Musical groups established in 2000